Muzzana del Turgnano is a comune (municipality) in the Province of Udine in the Italian region Friuli-Venezia Giulia, located about  northwest of Trieste and about  southwest of Udine.

Muzzana del Turgnano borders the following municipalities: Carlino, Castions di Strada, Marano Lagunare, Palazzolo dello Stella, Pocenia.

References

External links
 Official website

Cities and towns in Friuli-Venezia Giulia